The Sri Sowdeswari Vidyalaya Matriculation Higher Secondary School, Coimbatore or SSV Matric, is  in Coimbatore, Tamil Nadu, India. The school is run by Sri Ramalinga Sowdeswari Charitable Trust. The school educates students from LKG to Standard 12.
It offers education as per the Samacheer Kalvi and Higher Secondary board or Tamil Nadu State Board syllabus.
It is an English medium school. On Annual Day each year important personalities are invited.

History
The school was started on 1 June 1977 in a rented building at D.B.Road R.S.Puram. In 1997 the school shifted to its own building at Chokampudur, Coimbatore where the present campus is located.

Sports
Sports facilities available are:
 Basketball court
 Football ground
 Throw ball
 Handball
 Ball badminton
 Table tennis
 Shuttle badminton
 Kho-Kho
 Volleyball court

Students won two gold medals in the 200m running race and the javelin throw in the SDAT National women's sports festival district level competition 1held at Nehru Stadium, Coimbatore. In 2015, L.B. Nivetha, student of this school was one of the state topper in the Higher Secondary Examinations with a total of 1192 (out of 1200) marks and Tamil as their first language.

Facilities 
 Computer Lab
 Science Lab
 Communication Hall
 Student Teachers Canteen
 School Library
 Edu comp
 Physical Education Room
 student's Health room
 Separate Kinder Garden block
 CCTV protected

Extra curriculars 
 Yoga
 Music
 Quiz club [Cryptex quiz club]
 Scouts & Guides
 JRC[junior red cross]
 RSP[road safety patrol]

References

Primary schools in Tamil Nadu
High schools and secondary schools in Tamil Nadu
Schools in Coimbatore
Educational institutions established in 1977
1977 establishments in Tamil Nadu